Daniel Hulme (born 21 February 1980) is a British businessman, academic and commentator, working in the field of Artificial Intelligence (AI), applied technology and ethics. He is the CEO and founder of Satalia.

Hulme founded Satalia in 2007, a company that provides AI products and consultancy for governments and companies such as Tesco, PwC and the BBC. He received a doctorate in AI from University College London (UCL), and is now their  Computer Science Entrepreneur in residence, where he teaches how AI can be applied to solve business and social problems. Hulme is also a frequent public speaker and writer on the topics of AI, ethics, technology, innovation, decentralization and organisational design.

Early life and education
Hulme was born in 1980. He grew up in the seaside town of Morecambe in north west England.  After completing secondary school Hulme moved to London to study at University College London. On completing his under graduate degree, Hulme stayed at UCL to complete a master's degree and then a PhD. All three degrees were in subjects related to AI. In 2009 Hulme was awarded a Kauffman Global Entrepreneur Scholarship, which saw him visit institutes in the United States to better understand their culture of innovation, and what UK business people could learn from it. This included a tour of Stanford, MIT, Berkeley and  Harvard, along with a placement at Cisco Systems HQ in Silicon Valley.

Career

Satalia
Hulme founded NPComplete Limited in 2007, and incorporated it in 2008, a few months before completing his PhD. NPComplete Limited trades as Satalia. The London-based company provides full-stack AI consultancy and products, helping organisations harness data science, machine learning and AI to solve complex problems, including real-time optimisation. NPComplete refers to mathematical NP-completeness, which describes a class of exponential problems in the field of computational complexity theory. The trading name of NPComplete, Satalia, is intended as a portmanteau of SAT (Short for satisfiability, as in the Boolean satisfiability problem) and the Latin phrase Et alia. Satalia seeks to solve hard problems, in particular the class of exponentially hard problems found in academia and industry known as NP-hardness.  
While much of Satalia's focus in on helping firms cut costs and increase revenue, Hulme has stated the firm also has a higher vision. Which is to help anyone, from any part of the world, to contribute to innovations, and "to enable everyone to do the work they love", even if this is not the reality within Satalia itself. In 2016, Satalia was the only UK company to appear in the  Gartner Cool Vendors list for  data science.
 In November 2019, City A.M. reported that Satalia was the 39th fastest growing tech firm in the UK, with three year growth at 886%.

Academia
Hulme's master's degree topic was on simulating artificial life with Artificial Neural Networks. His PhD spanned modelling bumblebee brains and mathematical optimization. Hulme maintained his connection with UCL after completing his doctorate, staying on in various teaching positions. From 2014 to Oct 2019 he was the Director of UCL's Business analytics MSc, which dealt with the application of AI to government, social, and business problems. As of 2020, Hulme is UCL's Entrepreneur In Residence.  He is also a faculty member and lecturer at Singularity University, and a visiting lecturer at London School of Economics's Marshall Institute.

Public engagement
Hulme frequently speaks for TEDx, Google and at various other events. He specialises in Artificial Intelligence, Decentralization,  Organisational Design, and Innovation. He has written numerous articles and contributed to several books, largely concerning AI, as well as applied technology and related ethical issues. In 2017, along with Elon Musk, Stuart J. Russell, Geoffrey Hinton and Demis Hassabis, Hulme was one of the 116 founders of robotics and AI companies to sign an open letter to the United Nations, warning against the use of AI in autonomous weapons.  Hulme also consults with various companies, governments and other organisations, independently of Satalia.

References

External links
 Satalia home page

1980 births
Living people
Machine learning researchers
Artificial intelligence ethicists
Artificial intelligence researchers
Alumni of University College London